The New Yorkers is a musical written by Cole Porter (lyrics and music) and Herbert Fields (book). Star Jimmy Durante also wrote the words and music for the songs in which his character was featured.

The musical premiered on Broadway in 1930. It is based on a story by a cartoonist for The New Yorker, Peter Arno, and E. Ray Goetz. The musical satirizes New York types, from high society matrons to con men, bootleggers, thieves and prostitutes during Prohibition. The musical includes Porter's famous, sad song about a prostitute, "Love for Sale", which was banned from the radio for its frank lyrics. The original Broadway production received mostly good reviews and ran for 168 performances.

History
The musical was "built to order around star comic Jimmy Durante, indisputably featured special material (songs as well as bits) that wouldn't scan without Schnozzola himself delivering it." In fact, Durante himself wrote 5 of the 17 songs featured in the musical—the only 5 songs in which he was a featured performer.

Ray Goetz, who was the producer of the show as well as production supervisor, wanted to help audiences forget the Great Depression and so made The New Yorkers "as bright and sparkley as possible-from the variegated costumes and the Arno settings to the large and dynamic cast...He also featured a young group that had never appeared on Broadway as the stage band for the show: Fred Waring and his Pennsylvanians." The clean-cut band sang as well as played instruments.

Synopsis
Wealthy New York socialite Alice Wentworth has a romantic interlude with Al Spanish, a nightclub owner and bootlegger.  During their time together, they escape from the police and go to the bootlegging factory, among other adventures.  Jimmy Deegan and his buddies Ronald and Oscar aid in their escapades, invent a new alcoholic drink, murder Feet McGeehan and assist with the gangland wedding of Al and Alice, while offering tributes to money, wood, and "The Hot Patata". Jokes and songs about alcohol, and how far people will go to get it, such as "Drinking Song" and "Say It With Gin", reflect the musical's origin from the Prohibition period.

Musical numbers
Music and lyrics by Cole Porter except as noted

Act 1
Go Into Your Dance – Mona Low, Lola McGee and Toro Girls
The Hot Patata (Music and Lyrics By Jimmy Durante) – Jimmie Deegan, Ronald Monahan and Cyril Gregory
Where Have You Been? – Al Spanish and Alice Wentworth
Say It With Gin – Ensemble and Trainor Brothers
Venice† – Alice Wentworth, Ronald Monahan, Jimmie Deegan and Cyril Gregory
Love for Sale – May and Three Girl Friends
I'm Getting Myself Ready for You – Mona Low, James Livingston, Lola McGee and Alfredo Gomez
Drinking Song (Lyrics By Charles Henderson, Music By Fred Waring)–Waring's Pennsylvanians
The Great Indoors – Mona Low and Girls
Money (Music and Lyrics By Jimmy Durante) – Jimmie Deegan, Ronald Monahan and Cyril Gregory
Wood (Music and Lyrics By Jimmy Durante) – Jimmie Deegan, Ronald Monahan, Cyril Gregory and Company

Act 2
Sheikin Fool (Music and Lyrics By Jimmy Durante) – Jimmie Deegan, Ronald Monahan and Cyril Gregory
Let's Fly Away – James Livingston, Alice Wentworth and Ensemble
I Happen to Like New York – Mildew
Let's Fly Away (Reprise) – James Livingston, Alice Wentworth and Ensemble
Sing Sing for Sing Sing – Al Spanish and Waring's Pennsylvanians
Sing Sing for Sing Sing (Reprise) – Mona Low, Three Girl Friends and Waring's Pennsylvanians
Data (Music and Lyrics By Jimmy Durante) – Jimmie Deegan, Ronald Monahan, Cyril Gregory and Waring's Pennsylvanians
Sing Sing for Sing Sing (Reprise) – Waring's Pennsylvanians
Take Me Back to Manhattan – Entire Company

†Music missing; Lyric partially lost;

Productions
The New Yorkers began pre-Broadway tryouts at the Chestnut Street Opera House, Philadelphia, on November 10, 1930 and then moved to the Shubert Theatre, Newark on November 24, 1930.

The musical opened on Broadway at the Broadway Theatre on December 8, 1930, this theatre's first stage production, and closed on May 2, 1931 after 168 performances. Direction was by Monty Woolley, choreography by George Hale, special numbers staged and directed by Fred Waring, and production supervised by E. Ray Goetz. Costumes were by Peter Arno and Charles Le Maire, and the set design was by Dale Stetson, based on sketches by Peter Arno. The conductor was Max Meth. The cast featured Frances Williams as the hostess Mona Low, Charles King as Al Spanish, Hope Williams as Alice Wentworth, Ann Pennington as Lola McGee, Marie Cahill as Gloria Wentworth, the Fred Waring Orchestra, Lou Clayton as Cyril Gregory, Eddie Jackson as Ronald Monahan, Jimmy Durante as Jimmie Deegan, Kathryn Crawford as May (later replaced by Elisabeth Welch), and Oscar Ragland as Mildew. (Clayton, Jackson & Durante were a successful vaudeville act.)

The musical was performed at the Marriott Theatre in Lincolnshire in 1996. "Musicals Tonight!" presented the musical as a staged concert in April 2003 in New York City. The "Lost Musicals" series presented The New Yorkers at Sadler's Wells Theatre, London, in March and April 2009, starring Anna Francolini as Alice and Dawn Spence as Mona Low. The New York City Center presented it in March 2017 in their Encores! staged concert series with Tam Mutu, Scarlett Strallen and Kevin Chamberlin, directed by John Rando.

Response
Brooks Atkinson, theatre critic for The New York Times wrote that the musical "manages to pack most of the madness, ribaldry, bounce and comic loose ends of giddy Manhattan into a lively musical." As for Porter's songs, "most ... hold well to the average of song-and-dance scores."

The song "Love for Sale" was sung by an actress playing the role of a prostitute ("advertising young love for sale"). As recounted by Charles Schwartz in his biography Cole Porter, the critic for the World, Charles Darnton, "excoriated" the song and called it "in the worst possible taste." The song was subsequently banned from the radio.

The reviewer of the "Musicals Tonight!" 2003 concert noted that Peter Arno (who provided the story) was a cartoonist whose drawings appeared on the cover and pages of the magazine The New Yorker. "His subjects were jazz babies, society dames, gangsters, café habitues, with a specialization in the lusty and lustful. Herb Fields's book...is full of that kind of sexuality, with a heaping helping of puns and double (and triple) entendres."

References

External links
 
 "The New Yorkers: Reclaiming Cole Porter's Lost 'Pre-Code' Musical" by Jack Viertel, Playbill, republished by New York City Center, March 3, 2017

Musicals by Cole Porter
1930 musicals
Broadway musicals
Musicals by Herbert Fields